The Midland Air Museum (MAM) is situated just outside the village of Baginton in Warwickshire, England, and is adjacent to Coventry Airport. The museum includes the Sir Frank Whittle Jet Heritage Centre (named after the local aviation pioneer and inventor of the jet engine), where many exhibits are on display in a large hangar. It also has a small hangar, and a fenced-off green area where many aircraft are on display in the open.

Aircraft on display

The museum's two largest aircraft are an Avro Vulcan B.2 and an Armstrong Whitworth Argosy AW.650 (series 101).  The restored Avro Vulcan is a delta-winged aircraft that was originally part of the V bomber force and could be equipped with nuclear missiles as part of Britain's role in NATO's nuclear deterrent force during the Cold War. It is on display near the museum's car park, together with an Avro Blue Steel missile, an early design format of such a nuclear missile, and a Boulton Paul BP.111A, an experimental delta-winged aircraft of the 1950s.

The museum also has an English Electric Canberra PR.3, two English Electric Lightnings (the RAF's fastest ever interceptor), two Gloster Meteors (one on loan from the Royal Air Force Museum), an Armstrong Whitworth Sea Hawk FGA.6, a Mil Mi-24 helicopter, and many others.

List of aircraft on display

Former residents on the British Aircraft Preservation Council register
 BAPC. 25 - Nyborg TGN-111 glider.
 BAPC. 26 - Auster AOP.9.
 BAPC. 67 - Bf 109 (replica)
 BAPC. 68 - Hurricane (replica)
 BAPC. 69 - Spitfire (replica)
 BAPC. 72 - Hurricane (replica)
 BAPC. 125 - Clay Cherub

Engines on display
The Midland Air Museum has a number of aero engines on display with a dedicated section on the work of Frank Whittle.

Piston engines
Alvis Leonides
Bentley BR1
Rolls-Royce Griffon

Gas turbine engines
Armstrong Siddeley Mamba
Armstrong Siddeley Double Mamba
Armstrong Siddeley Sapphire
Armstrong Siddeley Viper
de Havilland Ghost (Svenska Flygmotor RM2)
Bristol Siddeley Orpheus
Rolls-Royce Avon
Rolls-Royce Derwent
Rolls-Royce Gem
Rolls-Royce Spey
Rover W2B/26

Rocket engines
Bristol Siddeley BS.605
Armstrong Siddeley Stentor

See also
List of aerospace museums

Notes

References

Wright, Alan J., Civil Aircraft Markings 1979. Ian Allan Ltd, Shepperton, Surrey, UK. .
Wright, Alan J., Civil Aircraft Markings 1981. Ian Allan Ltd, Shepperton, Surrey, UK. .
Wright, Alan J., Civil Aircraft Markings 1984. Ian Allan Ltd, Shepperton, Surrey, UK. .

External links

Midland Air Museum web site
Viscount F-BGNR owned by the Viscount 35 Association is currently on display at the Midland Air Museum.
A Canberra website with a section that charts the restoration  of the Museums Canberra PR.3 WF922 which was undertaken by Malcolm Lambert
Website about the Midland Air Museums Javelin FAW.5 XA699

Aerospace museums in England
Museums in Warwickshire